Jonathan Miramontes (born October 17, 1988, in Guadalajara, Jalisco) is a former Mexican professional footballer who last played for Sonora of Ascenso MX.

External links
Ascenso MX

Liga MX players
Living people
1988 births
Mexican footballers
Footballers from Guadalajara, Jalisco
Association footballers not categorized by position
21st-century Mexican people